William R. Orthwein Jr. (February 12, 1917 - June 1, 2011) was an American businessman and philanthropist.

Early life
William R. Orthwein Jr. was born February 12, 1917. His father, William R. Orthwein, was a lawyer who competed in water polo at the 1904 Summer Olympics, and his mother, Nina Kent Baldwin, was a schoolteacher. He had two brothers, Robert Baldwin Orthwein and David Kent Orthwein. His paternal grandfather, William D. Orthwein (1841–1925), was a German-born grain merchant in St. Louis.

Orthwein was educated at the Rossman School and the St. Louis Country Day School. He graduated from Yale University, where he received a degree in business in 1938.

Business career
Orthwein started his career as a salesman for the General American Life Insurance, now part of MetLife. In 1942, he joined McDonnell Douglas, now Boeing. He served as the president and chairman of one of its subsidiaries, the McDonnell Automation Co., from 1970 to 1982., and served on its board of directors until his death on June 1, 2011.

Additionally, Orthwein served on the boards of directors of the Mercantile Bancorporation and the Microdata Corporation.

Philanthropy
Orthwein was a generous philanthropist in St. Louis, Missouri. Over the years, he and his wife donated millions of dollars to the St. Louis Symphony Orchestra, the St. Louis Science Center, the Missouri Botanical Garden, and the Saint Louis Zoo, where they established the Orthwein Animal Nutrition Center. Orthwein served on the Boards of Trustees of the Boy Scouts of America, the Missouri Historical Society, the United Fund (now the United Way), and St. Luke's Hospital. He also endowed the William R. Orthwein chair at the Washington University School of Law.

Orthwein and his wife founded the William R. and Laura Rand Orthwein Foundation 2004, which had US$33 million under assets by 2009. Through the foundation, Orthwein donated US$2.5 million to the Yale School of Medicine to support scholarship in Ophthalmology and Visual Sciences in 2007. In 2015, posthumously, the foundation donated US$1 million to 'The Muny', an outdoors amphitheater in St. Louis.

Personal life
Orthwein married Laura Hale Rand, the daughter of Frank C. Rand, and the 1938 Queen at the Veiled Prophet Ball. They resided in Clayton, Missouri. They had three daughters: Laura Orthwein, known later as Laura Shaw Murra and as Laura X, who was 1959 Veiled Prophet Queen; Nina Durham; and Nettie Dodge.

Death
Orthwein died of pneumonia on June 1, 2011, in Clayton. His funeral took place at the Second Presbyterian Church in St. Louis, Missouri.

References

People from St. Louis County, Missouri
Yale University alumni
American corporate directors
Businesspeople from Missouri
Philanthropists from Missouri
American Presbyterians
Boeing people
American people of German descent
1917 births
2011 deaths
Deaths from pneumonia in Missouri
20th-century American businesspeople
20th-century American philanthropists
Orthwein business family
Washington University in St. Louis people